Daniel Carr (born November 1, 1991) is a Canadian professional ice hockey forward who is currently playing under contract with HC Lugano of the National League (NL).

Playing career
Carr played collegiate hockey with the Union Dutchmen in the NCAA Men's Division I ECAC Hockey conference. In his senior year, Carr's outstanding play was rewarded with a selection to the 2013–14 ECAC Hockey All-Conference First Team.

On April 24, 2014, as an undrafted free agent Carr signed a two-year entry-level contract with the Montreal Canadiens of the National Hockey League.

In the 2015–16 season, on November 29, 2015, against the Carolina Hurricanes, Carr became one of few NHL players to score a goal on the first shot during the first shift of their NHL debut. He re-signed with the Canadiens on July 1, 2016.

On July 1, 2018, Carr signed as a free agent to a one-year, $750,000 deal with the Vegas Golden Knights after not receiving a qualifying offer from the Montreal Canadiens. In the following 2018–19 season, Carr won the Les Cunningham Award as the AHL's MVP while he was assigned to the Golden Knights AHL affiliate, the Chicago Wolves. He recorded a career-best 30 goals and 41 assists for 71 points in just 52 games. He was recalled through the season to feature in 6 games for the Vegas Golden Knights, posting 1 goal. In returning to the Wolves for the 2019 Calder Cup playoffs, Carr recorded 12 points in 15 games before falling in the Finals to the Charlotte Checkers.

On July 1, 2019, Carr was rewarded for his outstanding season in securing a one-year, one-way $700,000 contract as a free agent with the Nashville Predators.

On September 5, 2020, Carr as a free agent from the Predators, was signed to a three-month contract through November 15 by HC Lugano of the National League (NL) as a replacement for injured Jani Lajunen. At the opening of free agency, Carr was signed by the Washington Capitals to a one-year, two-way contract on October 12, 2020. He remained in Switzerland with Lugano until the commencement of the Capitals training camp. In the 2020–21 season, Carr remained with the Capitals throughout the campaign, serving the majority of his tenure as a healthy scratch. He registered 1 assist in 6 regular season games and drew into a playoff contest in the Capitals first-round defeat to the Boston Bruins.

As an impending free agent, Carr returned to Switzerland, rejoining HC Lugano of the NL on a one-year contract on July 5, 2021.

International play
In January 2022, Carr was selected to play for Team Canada at the 2022 Winter Olympics.

Career statistics

Regular season and playoffs

Awards and honours

References

External links
 

1991 births
AHCA Division I men's ice hockey All-Americans
Canadian ice hockey left wingers
Chicago Wolves players
Hamilton Bulldogs (AHL) players
HC Lugano players
Ice hockey people from Alberta
Laval Rocket players
Living people
Milwaukee Admirals players
Montreal Canadiens players
Nashville Predators players
Powell River Kings players
Sportspeople from Sherwood Park
St. Albert Steel players
St. John's IceCaps players
Undrafted National Hockey League players
Union Dutchmen ice hockey players
Vegas Golden Knights players
Washington Capitals players
Ice hockey players at the 2022 Winter Olympics
Olympic ice hockey players of Canada